Belmira is a town and municipality in the northern subregion of the Colombian department of Antioquia. Approximately 62 km from the city of Medellin.

Climate
Belmira has a cold subtropical highland climate (Cfb). It has heavy rainfall year round.

Every December the town holds a traditional festival called Fiestas De La Trucha. The festival consists of a fishing competition and musical performances by local and traditional artists.

References

Municipalities of Antioquia Department